Kuijau (Kuiyow), also known as Hill Dusun, is an Austronesian language of Sabah, Malaysia.

References

External links 
 Materials on Kuijau are included in the open access Arthur Capell collection (AC2) held by Paradisec.

Dusunic languages
Languages of Malaysia
Endangered Austronesian languages